The Rocker: Music from the Motion Picture is a soundtrack album from the 2008 film The Rocker starring Rainn Wilson, Christina Applegate, Teddy Geiger, Josh Gad, Emma Stone, and Jane Lynch. The music was mainly composed and performed by musician and producer Chad Fischer, also known as frontman of the band Lazlo Bane.

Overview 
The official soundtrack for the film features all original songs performed by the fictional bands A.D.D. and Vesuvius. While A.D.D. also performed two covers in the film: "Nothin' But a Good Time", originally by Americаn glam metal band Poison, and "In Your Eyes", originally by British musician Peter Gabriel, only the first was included in the soundtrack.

Tracks credited to Teddy Geiger were recorded mostly by Chad Fischer with Geiger providing only lead vocals. The exception is a cover of "Nothin' But a Good Time", on which Teddy Geiger plays additional guitar. Track two "Bitter" and track nine "I'm So Bitter" are two versions of the same song with different arrangement and slightly different lyrics.

The actual vocals on Vesuvius songs are provided by Keith England. The song "Pompeii Nights" is a rerecording of The Rage song "Dirty Old Man" with different lyrics. The original was released on the album Big Spill. "Promised Land" is a new song recorded for the film by Chad Fischer and fellow Lazlo Bane member Tim Bright.

"The Rocker Score Suite" performed by Chad Fischer contains an excerpt of "Take No Prisoners" originally by The Rage from the album Big Spill.

Promotion
"Promised Land" was released as free downloadable content for the video game Rock Band, which is shown being played in the movie.

Chad Fischer also released a music video for the song "Tomorrow Never Comes" with his own lead vocals on YouTube.

Track listing

Personnel
Chad Fischer – guitar, bass, drums, keyboards, glockenspiel, additional vocals
Teddy Geiger – lead vocals (tracks 1–9), additional guitar (track 7)
Keith England – lead vocals (tracks 10–11)
Alex Lilly – additional vocals (tracks 1–6, 8)
Patrick Houlihan – bass and additional vocals (track 7)
Tim Bright – guitar (tracks 10–11), keyboards (track 10)
Chris Link – bass (track 11)
Chicken – additional vocals (track 11)
Mike Knobloch – cowbell (track 10)
Cecilia Noel – additional vocals (track 10)
Charissa Nielsen – additional vocals (track 10)
Scott Hull - mastering
Maria Paula Marulanda – art direction
George Kraychyk – stills photography

References

2008 soundtrack albums
Comedy film soundtracks
Rock soundtracks
Albums produced by Chad Fischer
Columbia Records soundtracks